The following article presents a summary of the 1998 football (soccer) season in Paraguay.

First division results

Torneo Apertura
The Apertura tournament was played in a single all-play-all system. At the end, the top eight teams qualified to a playoff stage to determine the Apertura champion.

Apertura playoff stage
The top eight teams qualified to this stage and were given bonus points based on their final standing in the table. Two groups of four teams were made, with the top two of each group advancing to a playoff stage.

Group stage
Group A

Group B

Semifinals

|}

Apertura final

|}

Olimpia wins the Apertura tournament final by aggregate score of 3-1.

Torneo Clausura
The Clausura tournament was played in a single all-play-all system. At the end, the top eight teams qualified to a playoff stage to determine the Clausura champion.

* Nacional finished in the top eight but their average points over three years forced the team to be relegated so they did not take part of the playoff stage. San Lorenzo took their place instead.

Clausura playoff stage
The top eight teams qualified to this stage and were given bonus points based on their final standing in the table. Two groups of four teams were made, with the top two of each group advancing to a playoff stage. San Lorenzo replaced Nacional in the playoff stage due to Nacional being relegated to the second division.

Group stage
Group A

Group B

Semifinals

|}

Clausura final

|}

Cerro P. wins the Clausura tournament final on penalty shootout 4-3.

National championship game
The national championship game was played between the Apertura and Clausura tournaments winners.

|}

Olimpia declared as national champions by aggregate score of 5-3.

Relegation / Promotion
 Nacional and Libertad automatically relegated to the second division after finishing last and second-to-last in the average points table based over a three-year period.
 Resistencia promoted to the first division by winning the second division tournament.

Qualification to international competitions
Olimpia qualified to the 1999 Copa Libertadores by winning the Torneo Apertura.
Cerro Porteño qualified to the 1999 Copa Libertadores by winning the Torneo Clausura.

Lower divisions results

Paraguayan teams in international competitions
Copa Libertadores 1998:
Cerro Porteño: Semi-finals
Olimpia: Round of 16
Copa MERCOSUR 1998:
Olimpia: Semi-finals
Cerro Porteño: Group stage
Copa CONMEBOL 1998:
Cerro Corá: First round

Paraguay national team
The following table lists all the games played by the Paraguay national football team in official competitions during 1998.

References
 Paraguay 1998 by Eli Schmerler, Andy Bolander and Juan Pablo Andrés at RSSSF
 Diario ABC Color

 
Seasons in Paraguayan football
Para